NJDC may refer to:
National Jewish Democratic Council
National Junior Disability Championships
National Juvenile Defender Center